London Bridge may refer to:

Bridges

 London Bridge, one of several bridges over the River Thames in central London, England
 London Bridge (Roman times)
 London Bridge (Early medieval times)
 London Bridge (1209) (or "Old London Bridge")
 London Bridge (1831) (or "New London Bridge"), the replacement for the 1209 London Bridge (see also Lake Havasu City entry below)
 London Bridge (1973), the present-day London Bridge and replacement for the 1831 bridge
 London Bridge (Dublin), a bridge over the River Dodder, Ireland
 London Bridge (Lake Havasu City), Arizona, U.S., re-assembled from the 1831 British bridge

Arts and entertainment

Film and television
 London Bridge (film), a 2014 Malayalam film 
 London Bridge (TV series), regional British soap opera

Literature
 London Bridge: Guignol's Band II, a novel by Louis-Ferdinand Céline
 London Bridges, a novel by James Patterson

Music
 "London Bridge Is Falling Down", a traditional English nursery rhyme and singing game
 "London Bridge" a song by Bread from the 1969 album Bread
 "London Bridge", a song by Cilla Black
 "London Bridge" (Fergie song), 2006
 "London Bridge", a 2012 song by Ed Sheeran featuring Yelawolf from the 2012 EP The Slumdon Bridge

Places
 London Bridge station, a railway terminus and connected London Underground station, England
 London Bridge (natural arch), on the coast of Torquay in Devon, England
 London Bridge (New South Wales), a limestone karst in Australia
 London Arch, formerly London Bridge, an offshore natural arch formation in the Port Campbell National Park, Australia
 London Bridge City, a development in London, England
 London Bridge Tower, a building in London, England; now called "The Shard"

Other uses
Operation London Bridge, the codename for plans surrounding the death of Queen Elizabeth II

See also
 List of bridges in London
 Bridge (ward), in the City of London 
 Tower Bridge, sometimes mistakenly referred to as London Bridge 
 Chapel of St Thomas on the Bridge, on the old London Bridge 
London Bridge attack (disambiguation), various attacks on or around the bridge